Lionel Justier (born 31 August 1956) is a French former professional footballer who played as a midfielder and defender.

Club career 
Justier made his debut for Paris Saint-Germain during the 1975–76 season. Along with Thierry Morin, François Brisson, and Jean-Marc Pilorget, he was one of the "four musketeers" of the PSG Academy. Justier was a very versatile player, and he could play in several positions from defender to attacking midfielder. During his career, he would go on to play for Paris FC, Brest, Nîmes, Angoulême, Montceau, Châtellerault, and Beauvais before retiring in 1989. He made 341 appearances and scored 28 goals in the first two tiers of France.

International career 
Justier was a U21 international before arriving at Paris Saint-Germain. He was also a B international during his career.

Personal life 
After Justier retired from professional football, he worked in a transportation company. He also simultaneously played at an amateur level with clubs in Mantes-la-Jolie and in Saint-Ouen-l’Aumône.

Honours 
Brest
 Division 2: 1980–81

References

External links 
 
 

1956 births
Living people
People from Asnières-sur-Seine
French footballers
Association football midfielders
Association football defenders
AC Boulogne-Billancourt players
Paris Saint-Germain F.C. players
Paris FC players
Stade Brestois 29 players
Nîmes Olympique players
Angoulême Charente FC players
FC Montceau Bourgogne players
SO Châtellerault players
AS Beauvais Oise players
Ligue 1 players
Ligue 2 players
French Division 3 (1971–1993) players
France under-21 international footballers
France B international footballers
Footballers from Hauts-de-Seine